Super Retail Group Limited is an Australian-based company which owns and operates a portfolio of retail brands across Australia and New Zealand. The brands include automotive retailer Supercheap Auto, outdoor and leisure retailers Macpac and BCF and sporting retailer Rebel (formerly Rebel Sport).

History
The company was founded in 1972 as a mail-order business selling automotive accessories from the Brisbane home of founders Reg and Hazel Rowe. The company opened several stores over the following decades, changing the name of the company to Super Cheap Auto in 1981 before returning to Super Retail Group in 2010.

As Super Cheap Auto, the company was listed on the Australian Stock Exchange at $1.97, which earned the co-founders $81.8 million.

In 2010, the company acquired Rays, a camping and outdoor goods store.

In 2011, the company acquired Rebel Sport and Amart Sports. In 2017, the Amart Sports brand was discontinued and merged into the Rebel Sport brand. The merger was designed to allow a focus on a single sporting goods brand and reduce costs.

Super Retail Group has also expanded into online sales.

In about April 2018 several Rays began to be liquidated, with the remainder stores planned to be merged with its recently acquired, New Zealand chain Macpac.

In December 2019 the group moved into their new $75 million office building situated on 6 Coulthards Ave in Strathpine.

Assets

Supercheap Auto
BCF
Rebel Sport
Macpac
Rebel Fit (formerly Workout World)

Former asset
Amart Sports
Rays

References

External links
 

 
1972 establishments in Australia
Retail companies established in 1972
Holding companies of Australia
Companies based in Queensland
Companies listed on the Australian Securities Exchange